Giorgio Cornaro (1613–1663) was a Roman Catholic prelate who served as Bishop of Padua (1642–1663).

Biography
Giorgio Cornaro was born in Venice, Italy in 1613.
On 14 July 1642, he was appointed during the papacy of Pope Urban VIII as Bishop of Padua.
On 20 July 1642, he was consecrated bishop by Marcantonio Bragadin, Bishop of Vicenza, with Faustus Poli, Titular Archbishop of Amasea, and Giovanni Battista Altieri, Bishop Emeritus of Camerino, serving as co-consecrators. 
He served as Bishop of Padua until his death in 1663.

References

External links and additional sources
 (for Chronology of Bishops) 
 (for Chronology of Bishops) 

17th-century Roman Catholic bishops in the Republic of Venice
Bishops appointed by Pope Urban VIII
1613 births
1663 deaths